Jeseník (until 1947 Frývaldov;) is a spa town in the Olomouc Region of the Czech Republic. It has about 11,000 inhabitants.

Administrative parts
Villages of Bukovice and Dětřichov are administrative parts of Jeseník.

Etymology

The original name of Jeseník was Freiwaldau/Frývaldov, deriving from German frei vom Walde, meaning "free from the woods". The name first appeared in Latin documents under the name Vriwald and later as Vrowald, Vrienwalde and Freynwalde. The Czech name of Frývaldov was a phonetic transcription of the German name.

After World War II the town was renamed along with many other towns containing German elements in their names. It is named after the surrounding mountains which are called Hrubý Jeseník or Jeseníky.

Geography
Jeseník is located in the historic Czech Silesia region. It lies on the confluence of the Bělá River, a tributary of the Eastern Neisse, with the small river of Staříč. The valley of the rivers belongs to the Zlatohorská Highlands. The southern part of the municipal territory is situated in the Hrubý Jeseník mountain range. The northern part extends to the Golden Mountains.

History

13th century
The first written mention of Jeseník is from 1267. It was probably founded during the colonization of the territory by the Bishops of Wrocław, who acquired the area in 1199. It became a town between 1284 and 1295, thanks to the development caused by its strategic location on a trade route from Moravia to Silesia and on the confluence of two rivers, and thanks to the iron ore deposits in the surroundings. In 1284 at the latest, a castle had to stand here.

14th–16th centuries
In the 14th century Freiwaldau developed as a centre of iron one processing. The first mention of the iron ore processing is from 1326, when thirteen hammer mills were already operating here. However, mining ended already at the end of the 14th century. In the second half of the 15th century, gold and silver were mined here.

From 1378 to 1463, the town was owned by the Mušín family. In the following decades it often changed owners. In 1506, the flourishing town was purchased by the Swabian Fugger dynasty who resumed mining activity. In the same year, the town obtained the Bergregal privileges. The iron ore deposits were soon exhausted or have become unprofitable, and the Fuggers sold the town back to the Wrocław bishops in 1547. The town developed crafts and gained many guild privileges at the turn of the 16th and 17th centuries. Linen weaving became the most important source of income.

17th–19th centuries

Jeseník was damaged several times during the Thirty Years' War. Between the years 1622 and 1684, the town was in the centre of the infamous Northern Moravia witch trials. A large fire severely damaged the town in 1696. Despite the difficulties, economic prosperity continued until 1742, when Jeseník became part of Austrian Silesia after the First Silesian War. Due to the loss of Silesian markets as the main customer of production, linen got into a crisis and the town lost its mining privileges.

New economic development occurred in the 19th century, when industrialization began and new factories and enterprises were established. Significant and world-famous was the Regenhart u. Rayman textile factory, established in 1822. The opening of the railway in 1888 also helped the development of the town. In 1808, the Grabenberg hamlet (later known as Gräfenberg/Gräfenberk, today Lázně Jeseník) was founded, and the spa was established here in the 1820s. Gräfenberg was incorporated into the town in 1868.

20th century
Jeseník remained with the Austrian Empire and the Austro-Hungarian Monarchy until World War I and the creation of Czechoslovakia in 1918. According to the Austrian administration census of 1910 the town had 6,859 inhabitants, with 6,588 (99.5%) were speaking German, 16 Czech and 13 Polish. Jews were not allowed to declare Yiddish, most of them thus declared German. Most populous religious groups were Roman Catholics with 6,552 (95.5%), followed by Protestants with 208 (3%) and the Jews with 83 (1.2%).

In 1938, Jeseník was ceded to Nazi Germany as a result of the Munich Agreement. It was administered as a part of Reichsgau Sudetenland. During World War II the Germans operated several forced labour subcamps of the Stalag VIII-B/344 prisoner-of-war camp in the town. The town was restored to Czechoslovakia after the defeat of Nazi Germany in World War II in 1945. The German population was expelled according to the Potsdam Agreement and Beneš Decrees in 1945.

In 1950, Bukovice and Dětřichov were joined to Jeseník. In 1997, Jeseník was damaged by the Central European flood.

Demographics

Economy
The town is well known for the Priessnitz Medical Spa. Vincenz Priessnitz founded here the world's first hydrotherapy institute in 1822. Today the spa forms large spa resort on the northern outskirts of the town. The spa is visited by people from all over Europe.

Transport

The Šumperk–Krnov railway line leads through Jeseník along with its own station.

Sights

Jeseník is poor in historical monuments. The oldest and most important monument in the town is the Jeseník Water Fortress. This Gothic castle from the 13th century was first documented in 1374. Since 1989, it has been owned by the state and houses the regional museum with permanent exhibitions on regional history, Northern Moravia witch trials and geomorphology.

The town hall dates from 1710. It has Renaissance core from the previous building from 1610, which was destroyed by fire in 1625.

There are several monuments in the town associated with the most important native, Vincenz Priessnitz. The tomb of Vincenz Priessnitz was built in 1853 and is today a protected heritage site. In 1909, the Monument to Vincenz Priessnitz was unveiled. It is  large and the statue of a healer measures . Today, his birth house is a museum of his life and work, administered by the regional museum.

The Polish Monument is a valuable sculpture from the 1890s documenting the importance of the local spa. At its top is a bronze crowned eagle with outstretched wings on a sphere. During the renovation in 2005, notes were discovered in its foundation, which contained a protest against the Partitions of Poland.

Notable people

Carl Ditters von Dittersdorf (1739–1799), Austrian composer and violinist; worked here as bishop's governor in 1773–1794
Vincenz Priessnitz (1799–1851), founder of hydrotherapy
Oscar Paul (1836–1898), German musicologist
Edmund Weiss (1837–1917), Austrian astronomer
Károly Khuen-Héderváry (1849–1918), Hungarian politician
Walter Reder (1915–1991), Austrian SS commander and war criminal
Diether Kunerth (born 1940), German contemporary artist
Luboš Pospíšil (born 1950), singer-songwriter
Jiří Švub (1958–2013), cross-country skier
Jirko Malchárek (born 1966), Slovak politician and racing driver
Anastasia Pustovoitova (born 1981), Russian football referee
Loukas Mavrokefalidis (born 1984), Greek basketball player
Petr Ševčík (born 1994), footballer

Twin towns – sister cities

Jeseník is twinned with:
 Bojnice, Slovakia
 Głuchołazy, Poland
 Neuburg an der Donau, Germany
 Nysa, Poland

Jeseník also cooperates with Prague 1 in the Czech Republic.

References

External links

Populated places in Jeseník District
Cities and towns in the Czech Republic
Spa towns in the Czech Republic
Czech Silesia